Damian Błocki (born 28 April 1989) is a Polish racewalker. In 2017, he competed in the men's 20 kilometres walk at the 2017 World Championships in Athletics held in London, United Kingdom.

References

External links 
 

Living people
1974 births
Place of birth missing (living people)
Polish male racewalkers
World Athletics Championships athletes for Poland